The Lester River Bridge (Bridge 5772) is a historic road bridge carrying Minnesota State Highway 61 (London Road) over the Lester River in Duluth, Minnesota, United States.  Structurally it is a reinforced concrete arch bridge with decorative stone facing.  It was built from 1924 to 1925.  In 2002 the bridge was listed as Lester River Bridge–Bridge No. 5772 on the National Register of Historic Places for its state-level significance in the themes of architecture, engineering, and transportation.  It was nominated for its Neoclassical architecture, impressive  span, and association with the opening of the highway along the scenic North Shore of Lake Superior.

See also
 List of bridges on the National Register of Historic Places in Minnesota
 National Register of Historic Places listings in St. Louis County, Minnesota

References

External links
 Lester River Bridge (Bridge 5772)–Minnesota Department of Transportation

1925 establishments in Minnesota
Bridges completed in 1925
Buildings and structures in Duluth, Minnesota
Concrete bridges in Minnesota
Deck arch bridges in the United States
National Register of Historic Places in St. Louis County, Minnesota
Neoclassical architecture in Minnesota
Road bridges on the National Register of Historic Places in Minnesota
Transportation in Duluth, Minnesota
Arthur R. Nichols works